Raja Ravi Varma (29 April 1848 – 2 October 1906) was an Indian painter and artist. He is considered among the greatest painters in the history of Indian art. His works are one of the best examples of the fusion of European academic art with a purely Indian sensibility and iconography. He was known as the first modern Indian artist. Specially, he was notable for making affordable lithographs of his paintings available to the public, which greatly enhanced his reach and influence as a painter and public figure. His lithographs increased the involvement of common people with fine arts and defined artistic tastes among common people. Furthermore, his religious depictions of Hindu deities and works from Indian epic poetry and Puranas have received profound acclaim. He was part of the royal family of erstwhile Parappanad, Malappuram district.

Raja Ravi Varma was closely related to the royal family of Travancore of present-day Kerala state in India. Later in his life, two of his granddaughters were adopted into the royal family, and their descendants comprise the present royal family of Travancore, including the latest three Maharajas (Balarama Varma III, Marthanda Varma III and Rama Varma VII).

Personal life 
Raja Ravi Varma was born M. R. Ry. Ravi Varma, Koil Thampuran of Kilimanoor at Kilimanoor palace in the erstwhile princely state of Travancore (present-day Kerala) into an aristocratic family that for over 200 years produced consorts for the princesses of the matrilineal Travancore royal family. The title Raja was conferred as a personal title by the Viceroy and Governor-General of India Lord Curzon.

Ravi Varma was the son of Ezhumavil Neelakanthan Bhattatiripad and Uma Ambabayi Thampurratti. His mother Uma Ambabayi Thampuratty belonged to the baronial family which ruled the Kilimanoor feudal estate within the kingdom of Travancore. She was a poet and writer of some talent, and her work Parvati Swayamvaram was published by Varma after her death. Ravi Varma's father was a scholar of Sanskrit and Ayurveda and hailed from the Ernakulam district in Kerala. Ravi Varma had two siblings, a sister named Mangala Bayi and a brother named Raja Varma (born 1860). The last-named was also a painter and worked closely with Ravi Varma all his life.

In 1866, at the age of 18, Varma was married to 12-year-old Bhageerthi Bayi (known formally as Pooruruttati Nal Bhageerathi Bayi Thampuratty) of the royal house of Mavelikkara, another major fief of Travancore kingdom. Notably, the house of Mavellikara was a branch of the Royal House of Travancore. Bhageerthi was the youngest of three sisters, and both of her elder sisters had been adopted into the royal family of Travancore in 1857 in order to carry on the lineage. They were known as the Senior and Junior Rani of Attingal, and in their progeny was vested the succession to the throne of Travancore. Therefore, Ravi Varma's connection to the royal family became very close due to his marriage with Bhageerthi. His children (because they belonged to their mother's family) would be royal by birth. The marriage, which was arranged by the parents in the proper Indian manner, was harmonious and successful. The couple were blessed with five children, two sons, and three daughters. Their elder son, Kerala Varma (b.1876) was of an excessively spiritual temperament. He never married and eventually renounced the world, leaving home for good in 1912. The younger son, Rama Varma (born 1879), inherited his father's artistic talent and studied at the JJ School of Arts, Mumbai. He was married to Gowri Kunjamma, sister of Dewan PGN Unnithan, and became the father of seven children.

The three daughters of Ravi Varma and Bhageerthi Bayi were Mahaprabha Amma (who features in two of Varma's most famous paintings), Uma Amma (named after Varma's mother) and Cheria Kochamma. In 1900 CE, the Royal House of Travancore once again faced a succession crisis. Bhageerthi's two elder sisters, who had been adopted in order to carry forward the lineage, had failed to produce the desired heirs. They had six children between them, but only two of those had survived, and both were boys (who also, incidentally, later died childless). According to the matrilineal Marumakkathayam system, the succession to the throne could only progress through females, and therefore it was necessary to make an adoption. Tradition dictated that two girls belonging to branches of the Royal Family be adopted together. They would be designated the Senior and Junior Rani of Attingal, and the succession to the throne of Travancore would be vested in their progeny, in accordance with the unusual and unique Marumakkathayam system of succession.

Two of Varma's granddaughters were marked by destiny to receive this honour, the main reason being that they were the nearest matrilineal (cognatic) kin to the incumbent Rani of Attingal. In August 1900, Mahaprabha's eldest daughter Lakshmi Bayi (aged 5 years) and Uma's eldest daughter Parvati Bayi (aged 4 years) were adopted into the Royal family of Travancore. It was Bharani Thirunal Lakshmi Bayi, their surviving grand-aunt, who formally adopted them. She died within one year of doing this, and the two girls were then installed as the Senior and Junior Ranis of Attingal respectively. They were married while yet in their early teens to two gentleman from suitable aristocratic families. It was the Junior Rani, Sethu Parvathi Bayi, who gave birth to the much-awaited heir in 1912, exactly a day after her sixteenth birthday. Incidentally, her husband was a grand-nephew of Raja Ravi Varma and belonged to Kilimanoor. The newborn child was the future Maharaja Chithira Thirunal, the last ruling Maharaja of Travancore. He was followed by a brother (the future Maharaja Marthanda Varma III) and a sister Lakshmi Bayi, the mother of Maharaja Rama Varma VII who is presently on the throne (since 2013). Meanwhile, the Senior Rani (Sethu Lakshmi Bayi, daughter of Mahaprabha Amma, and Regent from 1924 to 1931) also gave birth to two daughters later in life (in 1923 and 1926).

In this way, the entire present (existing) royal family of Travancore is descended from Raja Ravi Varma. Well known among his royal descendants are the writers Aswathi Thirunal Gowri Lakshmi Bayi and Shreekumar Varma, the artist Rukmini Varma and the classical musician Aswathi Thirunal Rama Varma.

Around Ravi Varma’s 57th birthday he announced his decision to accept Sanyasa, and retire from all worldly life when he turned 60. In his final years he suffered from grief for the death of Raja Raja Varma, and also from diabetes, which contributed to his death on October 2nd 1906.

Art career
Varma was patronised by Ayilyam Thirunal, the next Maharaja of Travancore and began formal training thereafter. He learned the basics of painting in Madurai. Later, he was trained in water painting by Rama Swami Naidu and rather reluctantly in oil painting by British portraitist Theodore Jenson.

The British administrator Edgar Thurston was significant in promoting the careers of Varma and his brother. Varma received widespread acclaim after he won an award for an exhibition of his paintings at Vienna in 1873. Varma's paintings were also sent to the World's Columbian Exposition held in Chicago in 1893 and he was awarded three gold medals. He travelled throughout India in search of subjects. He often modelled Hindu Goddesses on Indian women, whom he considered beautiful. Ravi Varma is particularly noted for his paintings depicting episodes from the story of Dushyanta and Shakuntala, and Nala and Damayanti, from the Mahabharata. Ravi Varma's representation of mythological characters has become a part of the Indian imagination of the epics. He is often criticized for being too showy and sentimental in his style but his work remains very popular in India. Many of his fabulous paintings are housed at Laxmi Vilas Palace, Vadodara.

Raja Ravi Varma Press

Apparently on the advice of the then Dewan (Prime Minister) of Travancore, T. Madhava Rao, Ravi Varma started a lithographic printing press in Ghatkopar, Mumbai in 1894 and later shifted it to Malavli near Lonavala, Maharashtra in 1899. The oleographs produced by the press were mostly of Hindu gods and goddesses in scenes adapted mainly from the Mahabharata, the Ramayana and the Puranas. These oleographs were very popular and continued to be printed in thousands for many years, even after the 1906 death of Ravi Varma.

The Ravi Varma press was the largest and most innovative press in India at that time. The press was managed by Varma's brother, Raja Varma, but under their management, it was a commercial failure. By 1899 the press was deeply in debt and in 1901, the press was sold to his printing technician from Germany, Fritz Schleicher. Schleicher continued to print Ravi Varma's prints but later employed other artists to create new designs. Schleicher also broadened the product of press to include commercial and advertisement labels. Under the management of Schleicher and his successors, the press continued successfully until a devastating fire destroyed the whole factory in 1972. Many of Ravi Varma's original lithographic prints were also lost in the fire.

Honours

In 1904, Viceroy Lord Curzon, on behalf of the British King Emperor, bestowed upon Varma the Kaisar-i-Hind Gold Medal. A college dedicated to fine arts was also constituted in his honour at Mavelikara, Kerala. Raja Ravi Varma High  at Kilimanoor was named after him and there are many cultural organizations throughout India bearing his name. In 2013, the crater Varma on Mercury was named in his honor. Considering his vast contribution to Indian art, the Government of Kerala has instituted an award called Raja Ravi Varma Puraskaram, which is awarded every year to people who show excellence in the field of art and culture.
 On his 65th death anniversary, India Post issued a commemorative postal stamp depicting Ravi Varma and his famous painting 'Damayanti and Swan'

Legacy

Raja Ravi Varma is sometimes regarded as the first modern Indian artist due to his ability to reconcile Western aesthetics with Indian iconography. The Indian art historian and critic Geeta Kapur wrote, 

Similarly, Baroda School artist Gulam Mohammed Sheikh also wrote about Ravi Varma as a modern artist. In his essay "Ravi Varma in Baroda," Sheikh asserted that Varma was a key figure in the establishment of Indian modern art, claiming that "the story of contemporary Indian art was never the same after Ravi Varma had entered it. He left his imprint on almost every aspect of it." Like Kapur, Sheikh praised Ravi Varma's integration of Indian and Western aesthetics and techniques, comparing him favorably to Indian modernist Nandalal Bose.

However, Ravi Varma's legacy is controversial. Fellow Baroda School artist and art historian Ratan Parimoo saw Ravi Varma in a less favorable light, derogatorily referring to him as kitsch and claiming Varma's work was less spiritually authentic than folk art and tribal art. He argued that Ravi Varma was responsible for the "vulgarity" of popular art, comparing Varma's work to the lurid colors and sexuality of popular images in calendar art and films.

Despite his controversial legacy, Ravi Varma continues to be an important figure for modern and contemporary Indian artists. For example, modern artist Nalini Malani recreated Ravi Varma's Galaxy of Musicians in her video installation Unity in Diversity to interrogate Ravi Varma's idealistic nationalism. Similarly, contemporary artist Pushpamala N. recreated several Ravi Varma paintings with herself as the subject to deconstruct Ravi Varma's idealized depictions of goddesses and Indian women.

List of major works
The following is a list of the prominent works of Ravi Varma. On the anniversary of what would be his 150th birthday, Google Arts and Culture released over 300 of his works online for everyone to view.

 Mohini playing with a ball
 Yashoda and Krishna
 Village Belle
 Lady Lost in Thought
 Damayanti Talking to a Swan
 The Orchestra
 Arjuna and Subhadra
 The heartbroken
 Swarbat Player
 Shakuntala
 Lord Krishna as Ambassador
 Jatayu, a bird devotee of Lord Rama is mauled by Ravana
 Victory of Indrajit
 The gypsies 
 A Lady Playing Swarbat
 Lady Giving Alms at the Temple
 Lord Rama Conquers Varuna
 Gheevarghese Mar Gregorios of Parumala
 Nair Woman
 Romancing Couple
 Draupadi Dreading to Meet Kichaka
 Shantanu and Matsyagandha
 Shakuntala Composing a Love Letter to King Dushyanta
 Girl in Sage Kanwa's Hermitage (Rishi-Kanya)
 Bharani Thirunal Lakshmi Bayi of Travancore
 Sri Shanmukha Subramania Swami
 Woman holding a fan
 3D painting of the Mysore king on a horse (available at the Mysore palace)

Gallery

In popular culture
J. Sasikumar made Raja Ravi Varma, an Indian documentary television film on the artist in 1997. It was produced by the Government of India's Films Division

Makaramanju (English: The Mist of Capricorn) is a 2011 Indian Malayalam-language romantic drama film by Lenin Rajendran starring Santosh Sivan as Varma, the film focuses on Varma's painting "Urvashi Pururavas". The 2014 Indian Hindi-language film, Rang Rasiya (English title: Colours of Passion) explores Varma's inspiration behind his paintings with Randeep Hooda in the role of the painter.

Bibliography

English
 Raja Ravi Varma: Painter of Colonial Indian by Rupika Chawla, Pub: Mapin Publishing, Ahmedabad, March 2010.
 Raja Ravi Varma – Oleographs Catalogue by D.Jegat Ishwari, Pub: ShriParasuraman, Chennai, 2010, 
 Ravi Varma Classic: 2008, Genesis Art Foundation, Cochin-18;45 colour plate with text by Vijayakumar Menon.
 The Painter: A life of Ravi Varma by Deepanjana Pal Random House India, 2011 
 Raja Ravi Varma – The Most Celebrated Painter of India: 1848–1906, Parsram Mangharam, Bangalore, 2007
 Raja Ravi Varma – The Painter Prince: 1848–1906, Parsram Mangharam, Bangalore, 2003
 Raja Ravi Varma and the Printed Gods of India, Erwin Neumayer & Christine Schelberger, New Delhi, Oxford University Press, 2003
 Raja Ravi Varma: The Most Celebrated Painter of India : 1848 – 1906, Classic Collection, Vol I & II. Bangalore, Parsram Mangharam, 2005
 Raja Ravi Varma: Portrait of an Artist, The Diary of C. Raja Raja Varma/edited by Erwin Neumayer and Christine Schelberger. New Delhi, Oxford University Press, 2005
 Divine Lithography, Enrico Castelli and Giovanni Aprile, New Delhi, Il Tamburo Parlante Documentation Centre and Ethnographic Museum, 2005
 Photos of the Gods: The Printed Image and Political Struggle in India by Christopher Pinney. London, Reaktion Book, 2004
 Raja Ravi Varma:Raja Ravi Varma:E.M Joseph Venniyur, former director of AIR
 Raja Ravi Varma: A Novel, Ranjit Desai -Translated by Vikrant Pande, Pub: Harper Perennial (2013), 
 Pages of a Mind: Life and Expressions, Raja Ravi Varma, Pub: Piramal Art Foundation (2016),

Malayalam
 Ravi Varma – A critical study by Vijayakumar Menon, Pub: Kerala Lalitha Kala Akademy, Trissur, 2002
 Raja Ravi Varmayum chitrkalayum, Kilimanoor Chandran, Department of Cultural Publications, Kerala Government, 1999.
 Chithramezhuthu Koyithampuran, P. N. Narayana Pillai.
 Raja Ravi Varma, N. Balakrishnan Nair.

Marathi
 "Raja Ravi Varma", a novel by Marathi language novelist Ranjit Desai translated into English by Vikrant Pande.

References

External links

 The largest collection of chromolithographs from the Ravi Varma Press which may be viewed in Hi-resolution
 Digital Prints of Raja Ravi Varma
 Raja Ravi Varma Art Gallery
 single largest collection
 Ravi Varma's Paintings
 Largest collection of the Lithographs from the Ravi Varma Press
 Beautiful collection of Raja Ravi Varma
 The Hindu: The royal artist by K.K. Gopalakrishnan
 1000 Oleographs from Raja Ravi Varma Press shown as Slide show
 The Tribune article about him
Collection of Oleographs from Raja Ravi Varma Press

 
1848 births
1906 deaths
Sibling artists
Indian painters
Mythological painters
Religious painters
People from Kerala
19th-century Indian people